Paduka Sri Sultan Mahmud Shah I ibni al-Marhum Sultan Muzzil Shah (died 22 May 1321) was the fifth Sultan of Kedah. His reign was from 1280 to 1321. He had ordered the construction of Kota Seputih and Kota Di Hulu Sungai Merpah as fortress from the  Tenasserim tribe.

External links
 List of Sultans of Kedah

1321 deaths
13th-century Sultans of Kedah
14th-century Sultans of Kedah